Charles Warrington (born May 28, 1971) is an American professional wrestler best known for his time in the World Wrestling Federation as the wrestler Mosh as one-half of the tag team The Headbangers along with Thrasher.

Professional wrestling career

Early career (1992–1996)
Warrington began training under Larry Sharpe and Glenn Ruth during the early 1990s; his earliest entrance theme was a montage of him driving a Yugo down the sidewalks of Winding Way Road in Stratford, New Jersey. In 1993 he would make several appearances in the World Wrestling Federation as an enhancement talent (under the name Chaz Ware). In 1994, he teamed up with his co-trainer Glenn Ruth. He and Ruth, working as the masked team "the Spiders" lost to Axel and Ian Rotten in ECW. Wrestling under a variety of names and gimmicks. Between 1995 and 1996, the Spiders would later change their gimmick and became the Headbangers working for Smoky Mountain Wrestling, independent circuit and United States Wrestling Association. The Spiders would work a few matches for the World Wrestling Federation in December 1995. After Smoky Mountain shut its doors down, the Headbangers would work full time for United States Wrestling Association and won the Mid-Eastern Wrestling Federation tag titles three times during the summer and fall of 1996.

World Wrestling Federation (1996-2001)

The Headbangers (1996–1999)

First appeared as themselves as the Spiders and then as The Flying Nuns, with Warrington as Mother Smucker and Ruth as Sister Angelica; debuting on the premiere broadcast of Shotgun Saturday Night along with Brother Love in January 1997. Warrington and Ruth were best known as Mosh (Warrington) and Thrasher (Ruth), The Headbangers, a pair of metal fans who dressed in kilts. They wrestled in the World Wrestling Federation (WWF) throughout the late-1990s, briefly holding the WWF Tag Team Championship in 1997 and the NWA Tag Team Championships in 1998.

Various gimmicks (1999) 
After Thrasher suffered a knee injury in May 1999, Warrington was renamed Beaver Cleavage, a reference to the TV series Leave It to Beaver. He appeared in black-and-white vignettes with his "mother", the voluptuous Mrs. Cleavage, and the two would exchange sexual innuendos (e.g. Mrs. Cleavage would offer Beaver some of "Mother's milk" when he complained that his cereal was dry). The gimmick was quickly scrapped (via a 'worked shoot' promo in which Warrington supposedly gave up on the character), and retailored.

On June 28, Warrington, now calling himself Chaz, ridiculed the Beaver Cleavage gimmick and identified Mrs. Cleavage as his girlfriend, Marianna Komlos, in a shoot-style interview. Warrington and Komlos feuded with Meat and his female entourage, then with Prince Albert. Warrington left Komlos on the September 9 episode of SmackDown!, and she begged him to take her back throughout the night. On the September 13 episode of Raw is War, Komlos came to ringside with a black eye, and it was implied that Warrington had beaten her. Over the following weeks, Warrington would be on the receiving end of beatdowns from various wrestlers as well as being the victim of biased calls and actions by officials, all of whom were angry at Warrington for allegedly beating Komlos. Komlos attempted to have police arrest Warrington, but he was saved by the intervention of Thrasher, who showed film that demonstrated that Komlos was lying. Komlos was arrested, and the Headbangers were reformed.

Headbangers reunion and Lo Down (1999–2001)
The Headbangers then took on a gimmick where they would dress as the opponents that they feuded with, such as the Dudley Boyz and the Mean Street Posse.  They later turned heel, and began to dress in drag, most notably wearing breast cones. In June 2000, Warrington, once again known as Chaz, formed a new tag team with D'Lo Brown known as Lo Down. They enjoyed minor success, but were paired with Tiger Ali Singh and given the gimmicks of two bitter ethnic wrestlers who felt that they were being held down. They were given new ring attire, incorporating turbans and sashes, began using Tiger's entrance music, and were even given Arabic sounding names on one episode of Sunday Night Heat. The popularity of the team rapidly dwindled; at the 2001 Royal Rumble they were both denied a spot in the Rumble match, as their spot had been given to comedian Drew Carey. The team was eventually taken off TV, and Singh and Warrington were sent to developmental territory. Chaz worked for IWA Puerto Rico in June and July 2001. 

Chaz had his final WWF match on the July 30, 2001 edition of Raw is War in a dark match defeating the Inferno Kid.

Independent circuit (2001–present)
After being released form the WWF in August 2001, Chaz wrestled occasionally on the independent circuit in Florida and Maryland Championship Wrestling.

On August 6, 2005, Chaz defeated Norman Smiley for the MXPW Heavyweight Championship in Okeechobee, Florida. He dropped the title to The Warlord on April 29, 2006. 

On February 12, 2011, Mosh reunited with Thrasher for the first time since WWF in June 2000. That night they defeated Christian York and Danny Doring at Maryland Wrestling Federation in Severn, Maryland. 

Mosh and Thrasher appeared on the Ring of Honor pay-per-view Best in the World on June 24, 2012 as the masked tag team Guardians of Truth, managed by Truth Martini. They lost to the Briscoe Brothers. Later on, the two would unmask themselves and go on to compete as the Head Bangers.

Warrington also plays outfield for the nationally ranked Fort Lauderdale professional kickball team "The Meatballs". In 2013, he joined Ring Warriors under the nickname That Simply Tremendous Dude. On October 14, 2013, he presented his Simply Tremendous Delegate Adam Barisano. The next week, Warrington turned heel, defeating Shooter Storm.

Return to WWE (2016)
On August 26, 2016, it was reported that Mosh and Thrasher would return to WWE, as part of the SmackDown brand. They lost their return match to Heath Slater and Rhyno on the August 30 episode of SmackDown. They also fought The Usos for a chance to compete at Survivor Series, but ended up losing. The Headbangers appeared on the November 15, 2016 900th episode edition of SmackDown Live teaming-up with other villainous teams.

Other media
Warrington appeared in the 1996 film Box of Moonlight as "Castroater".

Championships and accomplishments
	Atomic Revolutionary Wrestling
 ARW Tag Team Championship (1 time, current) - with Thrasher
Coastal Championship Wrestling
CCW Tag Team Championship (1 time) – with Thrasher
Fighting Evolution Wrestling
FEW Tag Team Championship (2 times, current) – with Thrasher
Figure Wrestling Federation
FWF Tag Team Championship (1 time) - with Thrasher
Heroes And Legends Wrestling
 HLW Tag Team Championship (1 time, current) - with Thrasher
Heartland Wrestling Association
HWA Tag Team Championship (1 time) – with Thrasher
Independent Professional Wrestling Alliance
IPWA Tag Team Championship (1 time) – with Thrasher
Insane Championship Wrestling
ICW Streetfight Tag Team Championship (1 time) – with Thrasher
Main Event Championship Wrestling
MECW Tag Team Championship (1 time) – with Thrasher
Maryland Championship Wrestling
MCW Heavyweight Championship (1 time)
MCW Tag Team Championship (1 time) – with Thrasher
Maximum Xtreme Pro Wrestling
MXPW Heavyweight Championship (1 time)
National Wrestling Alliance
NWA World Tag Team Championship (1 time) – with Thrasher
National Wrestling League
NWL Tag Team Championship (1 time) – with Thrasher
New England Wrestling Federation
NEWF Tag Team Championship (3 times) – with Thrasher
Pro Wrestling Illustrated
Ranked No. 104 of the top 500 singles wrestlers in the PWI 500 in 1997
Texas Wrestling Alliance
TWA Tag Team Championship (1 time) – with Thrasher
World Wrestling Alliance / WWA New Jersey
WWA Tag Team Championship (1 time) – with Thrasher
World Wrestling Federation
WWF Tag Team Championship (1 time) – with Thrasher
Wrestling For Charity
WFC Tag Team Championship (1 time) - with Thrasher

References

External links 
 
 
 

1971 births
20th-century professional wrestlers
21st-century professional wrestlers
American male professional wrestlers
Living people
People from Cherry Hill, New Jersey
Professional wrestlers from New Jersey
Sportspeople from Camden County, New Jersey
NWA World Tag Team Champions